is a Japanese motorcycle racer. He has competed in the MFJ All Japan Road Race GP125 Championship, the MFJ All Japan Road Race J-GP3 Championship and the MFJ All Japan Road Race ST600 Championship.

Career statistics

Grand Prix motorcycle racing

By season

Races by year
(key)

References

External links

1990 births
Japanese motorcycle racers
Living people
125cc World Championship riders